Design International is an international architectural firm, which was founded in Toronto in 1965. The firm initially operated mainly in the North American market but has since developed into a major international player and was one of the first architecture companies that truly worked on a global scale. The company headquarters are in London, with subsidiary offices in Shanghai, Milan and Dubai.

Design International works across 7 integrated divisions: Architecture, Masterplanning, Interior Design, Lighting Design, Landscape Design, Branding & Signage, and Leasing. The company is run by CEO Davide Padoa.

The firm's portfolio includes a number of award-winning developments, especially in the retail and entertainment sector, such as CocoWalk (1990), an upscale lifestyle center in the Coconut Grove neighborhood of Miami, Florida; Odysseum (2009), a retail and entertainment complex in Montpellier, France; and the iconic Morocco Mall (2011), Africa's largest destination mall located on the Casablanca beachfront promenade. The mall also includes one of only four Galeries Lafayette stores outside France. And more recent awards such as Ada Mall (2017), the most inviting shopping mall in Belgrade with a strong local connotation and a daring design, opened in May 2019. Caselle Open Mall (2018) a project right next to Turin Airport with innovating open-streets which combines contemporary hi-tech elements with natural stone walkways. And finally, Tunis Garden City "the city within the city", a mixed-use project in Tunisia winner of the RLI Awards 2019.

In 2018, the firm completed Ferrari Centro Stile, which is located in Maranello, Italy. The project has been directed by the Ferrari Design Team led by Arch. Flavio Manzoni and the architectural project has been designed in cooperation with London studio Design International, led by Arch Davide Padoa and with Planning engineering studio from Bologna. The Centro Stile even is the company’s Tailor Made studio, where special customers design and custom the Ferrari of their dreams.
Design International is also responsible for the Cleopatra Mall, which is due to open in 2019 in Cairo, Egypt. The shopping mall, which is currently under construction, is characterised by a gigantic canopy covering the central area of the scheme with a span of over 200 metres. The project includes over 300 shops and restaurants, and is set to include an outdoor musical fountain, gourmet markets and Egypt’s first dedicated luxury mall inside a shopping centre.

Major projects 

 CocoWalk (1990), Miami, USA
 LuLu Mall, Trivandrum (2019), India
 Power Plant Mall (2000), Rockwell Center, Makati, Philippines 
 Odyssseum (2009), Montpellier, France
 Arena Centar (2010), Zagreb, Croatia
 Morocco Mall (2011), Casablanca, Morocco
 Galeries Lafayette (2011), Casablanca, Morocco
 Nave de Vero (2014), Venice, Italy
 Fountainebleau Deluxe Mall (2017), Cairo, Egypt
 Milano Arese (2016), Milan, Italy
 Milano Santa Giulia (2017), Milan, Italy
 Mall of Guadalajara (2016), Guadalajara, Mexico
 Centerfalls (2016) Beirut, Lebanon
 Ferrari Centro Stile (2018), Maranello, Italy
 Ada Mall (2019), Belgrade, Serbia

References

The International Property Awards 2017
European Property Awards 2018
The Global RLI Awards 2019

Architecture firms of Canada
Companies based in Toronto
Design companies established in 1965